Morón is a surname which may refer to:

 Alonzo G. Morón (1909–1971), Danish Virgin Islands-born American educator, university president, and civil servant
 Guillermo Morón (1926–2021), Venezuelan writer and historian
 Jaime Morón (1950–2005), Colombian footballer
 Daniel Morón (born 1957), Argentine former football goalkeeper who played in Chile
 Álex López Morón (born 1970), Spanish retired tennis player
 Erik Morón (born 1975), Bolivian politician
 Gisela Morón (born 1976), Spanish synchronized swimmer and 2008 Olympic silver medalist

See also 
 Edgar Moron (born 1941), German politician

Spanish-language surnames